Thorvig Svahn (July 5, 1893 – September 8, 1942) was a Swedish track and field athlete who competed in the 1920 Summer Olympics. In 1920 he finished ninth in the high jump competition.

References

External links
profile 

1893 births
1942 deaths
Swedish male high jumpers
Olympic athletes of Sweden
Athletes (track and field) at the 1920 Summer Olympics
20th-century Swedish people